The 2017–18 Fresno State Bulldogs women's basketball team represents California State University, Fresno during the 2017–18 NCAA Division I women's basketball season. The Bulldogs, led by fourth year head coach Jaime White, play their home games at the Save Mart Center and were members of the Mountain West Conference. They finished the season 17–15, 11–7 in Mountain West play to finish in a tie for fourth place. They lost in the quarterfinals of the Mountain West women's tournament to Colorado State. They received an invite to the WBI where they defeated UC Irvine in the first round before losing to Mountain West member Nevada in the quarterfinals.

Roster

Schedule

|-
!colspan=9 style=| Exitbition

|-
!colspan=9 style=| Non-conference regular season

|-
!colspan=9 style=| Mountain West regular season

|-
!colspan=9 style=| Mountain West tournament

|-
!colspan=9 style=| WBI

See also
 2017–18 Fresno State Bulldogs men's basketball team

References

Fresno State Bulldogs women's basketball seasons
Fresno State
Fresno
Fresno
Fresno